This is a list of films released in Japan in 1969. In 1969, there were 3602 movie theatres in Japan, with 2047 showing only domestic films and 845 showing both domestic and imported films. In total, there were 494 Japanese films released in 1969. In total, domestic films grossed 21,400 million yen in 1969. The highest grossing domestic film of 1969 was Samurai Banners.

List of films

See also
1969 in Japan
1969 in Japanese television

References

Footnotes

Sources

External links
Japanese films of 1969 at the Internet Movie Database

1969
Lists of 1969 films by country or language
Films